A crucifer or cross-bearer is, in some Christian churches (particularly the Roman Catholic Church, Anglican Communion, Lutherans, and United Methodist Church), a person appointed to carry the church's processional cross, a cross or crucifix with a long staff, during processions at the beginning and end of the service.

Etymology
The term "crucifer" comes from the Latin crux (cross) and ferre (to bear, carry). It thus literally means "cross-bearer". Use of the term "crucifer" is most common in Anglican churches. In the Catholic Church the usual term is "cross-bearer".

In the Roman Catholic Church
In the Latin Catholic Church the function of the crucifer/cross-bearer was generally carried out by a subdeacon until Pope Paul VI decreed in his motu proprio Ministeria quaedam of 15 August 1972 that "the major order of subdiaconate no longer exists in the Latin Church". In line with that document, the functions previously assigned to the subdeacon are now entrusted to the acolyte and the reader.

A seventeenth-century Council of Milan stated that a crucifer should, when possible, be a cleric and that, if a lay person be selected, that "the most worthy of the laity should be selected for the office." For more solemn processions, the cleric should be vested in amice, alb, and tunic. On less solemn occasions he may just be vested in surplice. During the procession the staff is held with both hands such that the cross is well above the head. The cross-bearer leads the procession except when there is a thurifer and is accompanied by two servers on the more solemn occasions.

See also
 Acolyte
 Altar cross
 Altar server
 Processional Cross
 Thurifer

References

Christian worship roles
Minor orders
Ecclesiastical titles